Ryan Buchanan is an American politician serving as a member of the New Hampshire House of Representatives from the Merrimack 15 district. Elected in November 2018, he assumed office on December 5, 2018.

Education
Buchanan earned a Bachelor of Science degree in business accounting from the University of New Hampshire at Manchester.

Career
Buchanan served in the United States Navy. On November 6, 2018, Buchanan was elected to the New Hampshire House of Representatives where he represents the Merrimack 15 district. Buchanan assumed office on December 5, 2018. Buchanan is a Democrat. Buchanan endorsed Bernie Sanders in the 2020 Democratic Party presidential primaries.

Personal life
Buchanan resides in Concord, New Hampshire. He is married and has two children.

References

Living people
University of New Hampshire alumni
Politicians from Concord, New Hampshire
Democratic Party members of the New Hampshire House of Representatives
21st-century American politicians
Year of birth missing (living people)